The El Camino Real Derby is a Listed American Thoroughbred horse race held in February at Golden Gate Fields in Albany, California. The race is open to three-year-olds willing to race one and one-eighth miles (9 furlongs) on Tapeta, a synthetic racing surface.

Northern California's premier Kentucky Derby prep, the El Camino Real Derby was first run in 1982. It was hosted by Bay Meadows racetrack until its closing in August 2008.

Originally a Grade III race, the event was downgraded in 2018 to listed status. It is part of the Road to the Kentucky Derby.

Records
Stakes Record:
 1:39.40 – Ruhlmann (1988)

Most wins by a jockey:
 9 – Russell Baze (1984, 1998, 2005, 2006, 2007, 2009, 2010, 2011, 2014)

Most wins by a trainer:
 6 – Jerry Hollendorfer (1998, 2002, 2006, 2007, 2009, 2014)

Most wins by an owner:
 2 – Jenny Craig (2002, 2009)

Winners of the El Camino Real Derby since 1982

† filly

See also
Road to the Kentucky Derby

References

February 21, 1990 New York Times article on the creation of the Preview Stakes
The Holy Bull Stakes at Pedigree Query
History of the El Camino Real Derby (PDF)
The El Camino Real Derby at Pedigree Query

Bay Meadows Racetrack
Horse races in California
Golden Gate Fields
Flat horse races for three-year-olds
Triple Crown Prep Races
Graded stakes races in the United States
Recurring sporting events established in 1982